is a Japanese light novel series by Toshihiko Tsukiji, with illustrations by Senmu. The series contains 15 volumes, published by Media Factory under their MF Bunko J imprint between November 2006 and March 2010. The main series covers 12 volumes, while the remaining three are short story collections. A manga adaptation by Yu Tachibana started serialization in the April 2008 issue of Monthly Comic Alive. A 12-episode anime adaptation aired in Japan between October and December 2009 on TBS, and concluded in 2011 with Kämpfer für die Liebe.

Plot
Natsuru Senō attends a high school that separates boys from girls. One day, Natsuru discovers he has turned into a girl.

Natsuru attracts the attention of various girls at school who are Kämpfer, including a shy bookworm girl Akane Mishima who transforms into a gunslinging loudmouth, the beautiful but scheming student council president Shizuku Sangō, and later Natsuru's childhood friend Mikoto Kondō. Natsuru is sometimes able to change back to being a boy, but because his emotions might transform him, he must then live as a male student as well as a female student with the same name at the school while keeping his switching identity a secret. To complicate things, Sakura herself is strongly attracted to Natsuru's female form, and seems to be tied to the overall formation of the Kämpfer. Later stories involve Natsuru and the girls involved in fights with other Kämpfer groups. Originally the Kämpfer are divided into two opposing factions, Red and Blue, but White Kämpfer are formed after a truce is reached between elements within the Red and Blue Kämpfer.

Characters

Main characters

The viewpoint character of the light novels, Natsuru is a second-year student at Seitetsu High School. He has a crush on Kaede Sakura, one of the school's beauties. At the start of the story, he discovers that he has transformed into a girl, and learns that he has been chosen to be a Kämpfer with Zauber, or magic powers, such as casting fireballs. As a girl, he has longer hair styled in a ponytail. After a fight with Shizuku causes him to expose his Kämpfer form to other students of the school, Natsuru is enrolled as a girl of the same name at the school, quickly ranking among the school beauties Kaede and Shizuku. Natsuru's female form becomes the subject of intense affection from Kaede Sakura (who has displayed no particular interest in his normal male form), nearly the entire female student body, and the boys, including his male classmates. The conclusion of the story varies for each medium: The last volume of the light novels has him staying with Akane, the manga series he falls in love with Shizuku, and the anime is left undecided.

Shizuku's childhood friend and one of the Three Beauties of Seitetsu. A lot of people like her, including Natsuru. She has a large collection of stuffed Entrails Animal series dolls and likes to present them to her friends; those who receive the dolls, however, tend to end up becoming Kämpfers. She began to develop an infatuation with Kämpfer Natsuru after being saved from Kämpfer Akane at the beginning of the series, later coming under the mistaken impression that the normal Natsuru is her rival for Kämpfer Natsuru's affection and consequently becoming somewhat hostile to him, a situation not helped after a misunderstanding in a very compromising situation leads her to think Natsuru is cheating on the female Natsuru.

Kaede's infatuation with Kämpfer Natsuru quickly grows into obsession as she begins to make sexual advances to Natsuru's female form, to the point of repeatedly barging in on her taking a shower and sneaking into her futon at night. She wields both a katana and a Beretta 93R against the Red and Blue Kämpfer coalition.

It is implied that she was always aware that the two Natsurus are the same person, although her obsession with his female form is genuine. Kaede is also shown to be strongly into female-female romance, even stating that she hates men and thinks they are useless. Kaede's extensive collection of Entrails Animals is shown to be the source of the Entrails Animal messengers that turn people into Kämpfer, that she dotes on her collection, to the point of calling them "her children" and her favorite is the prototype, Burnt Alive Lion. In the end, she confesses her love for Natsuru regardless of his form, but is ultimately rejected.

A bespectacled honor student helping in the school library and Natsuru's friend, she is also a Blue Kämpfer like Natsuru. Normally very shy and soft-spoken, she becomes the exact opposite upon transforming into a Kämpfer, becoming foul-mouthed, aggressive, violent, and trigger-happy. Her short brown hair turns red in her Kämpfer form. She has a tendency to misunderstand what others are trying to say or do in a borderline-erotic way. She explains most of the rules of being a Kämpfer to Natsuru when his own Messenger gave him no such details. She is a Gewehr-("gun-" or "rifle-")type Kämpfer who uses a black Springfield M1911A1 .45 pistol and appears to be ambidextrous.
Her gun has the special property of having unlimited ammunition and does not need reloading. In addition to having Natsuru as the first male to establish friendship with her, Akane eventually begins to harbor romantic feelings for him, becoming jealous and easily irritable when he talks about another girl (most if not all of the time being Kaede) in front of her or when another girl takes an interest in him (whether that interest is romantic in nature or not). Despite often responding with indifference, however, Natsuru does later on tell her that if Kaede were never on his mind, Akane (her normal form) would have been his type of girl. As a Kämpfer, the messenger assigned to Akane by the Moderators is Black Seppuku Rabbit, a plush toy that is part of the Entrails Animals series of stuffed toys. She is the girl that Natsuru chooses at the end of the novels.

The President of the Student Council and one of the Three Beauties of Seitetsu, she is a model honor student with a perfect attendance record. She has a lot of admirers, especially from the boys' side who are obsessed with fantasies of her dominating them as Student Council President. She has a calm, confident demeanor which is sometimes interpreted as cold and calculating, especially by Natsuru. She is a Red Kämpfer, which initially puts her at odds with him, and is also a Schwert-("sword-")type Kämpfer who prefers to fight wielding two short swords/daggers linked by a chain. Her weapons have the special property of extending its chain length to necessary lengths to enable her to fight even at long range. In her Kämpfer form, the reverse side of her long black hair partially turns white, which makes the color change only visible from the front, while leaving her hair dark when seen from behind. She easily deduces Natsuru and Akane's Kämpfer identities after encountering them in the library and interrogating them. She has a personal objective of finding the reason why Kämpfer must fight each other, and to that end she initially fought the Blue Kämpfer to learn more.
After being defeated by Natsuru and Akane in a battle, she is spared by Natsuru in exchange for Shizuku not involving Kaede in future battles. She enters an informal truce with Natsuru and Akane while she gathers more information about the Kämpfer system and has since taken an increasing romantic interest in male Natsuru, slyly teasing him with her demands and advances, even going so far as to steal his first kiss all without losing her composure and demeanor, which makes Natsuru even more suspicious of her, despite her not harboring any actual hostile intentions toward him. Shizuku continues to give off hints to Natsuru that she is romantically interested in him, in spite of his extra denseness regarding her feelings, even asking him out on a real date and even passionately kissing him in front of Kaede and the others, although her ambiguous demeanor again seems to become her undoing (a fact she seems to have realized, calling her love an unrequited one), as Natsuru keeps thinking that she is up to something whenever she makes an advance on him.
She seeks to know why Kämpfer must fight because, as she told Natsuru, she resents being used as a pawn by the Moderators, and seeks her goal in the hope of fulfilling her ultimate objective of taking revenge against the organizers of the Kämpfer system, which cost her the life of a dear friend in the past, who was also a Red Kämpfer like her. In order to fight back against the system, and indirectly its organizers, she and her new Red Kämpfer ally Mikoto later enter into a formal truce and join forces with the Blue Kämpfer Natsuru and Akane, violating the rule that all Kämpfer must fight, antagonizing the Moderators in the process, who send the White Kämpfer to eliminate them for rebelling against the system. As a Kämpfer, the messenger assigned to Shizuku by the Moderators is Electrocuted Wildcat, a plush toy that is part of the Entrails Animals series of stuffed toys. At the end of the novels when Natsuru chooses Akane, she cries for him because her love was genuine. At the end of the manga she is chosen by Natsuru seen as the two are holding hands.

Natsuru's widely-traveled, energetic childhood friend who only recently reunited with him due to her father being an archaeologist who lives and widely travels abroad. As a result of her lifestyle, she has become a highly adventurous, risk-taking person. Mikoto sends Natsuru postcards regularly during her travels abroad, so they keep in touch even if she is away. Although she has too much pride to explicitly admit it, she has feelings for Natsuru and is more than a bit bothered by the rumors of a girl with the same name as his (who in reality is Natsuru in his Kämpfer form) and who is supposedly his romantic interest. Even after the misunderstanding is later cleared up, the advances made by Akane and Shizuku on Natsuru (Mikoto apparently does not believe Kaede would reciprocate his feelings) subsequently makes her even more nervous about her chances with him as well.
As a result, she enters their rivalry for Natsuru's affections. When she attended the Miss Seitetsu beauty contest of the school festival, she caught a bouquet that Kaede tossed with a Messenger hidden in it, consequently being turned into a Schwert-type Red Kämpfer armed with a katana. When in Kämpfer form, Mikoto's hair becomes a much lighter color and her uniform changes to a mostly reverse color of the original Seitetsu girls' uniform. Her love for curry shows itself to the point of her cooking and consuming it for every meal, even to the extent of bringing a large pot of it when she goes to sleep over in someone else's home. As a Kämpfer, the messenger assigned to Mikoto by the Moderators is Strangled Stray Dog, a plush toy that is part of the Entrails Animals series of stuffed toys.

Messengers
They take the form of Entrails Animals, stuffed animals that are notable for having their intestines sticking out from their bellies and names referring to different methods of death. Many of them have been described in the novels as having voices similar to those of specific real-life voice actors, who would in turn do the voices for them in the anime. There are five major Messengers in the anime series.

Messenger for Natsuru in the form of a stabbed, scarred tiger that wears an eyepath and blood oozing from its mouth. In a scene where Natsuru was asked to turn on the TV in the hotel, it stated a preference for watching the Sazae-san anime; Michiko Nomura, who voices it, is also the voice of one of the characters in that show.

Messenger for Akane in the form of an impaled rabbit which has bloodshot eyes and blood oozing from its mouth. It speaks with a sarcastic tone and has a foul mouth although it is on good terms with Harakiri Tora. Its voice was described as sounding like that of Yukari Tamura, who voices it in the anime. In a scene where Natsuru was asked to turn on the TV in the hotel, it stated a preference for watching pay-channel pornography.

Messenger for Shizuku in the shape of a white wildcat with bristling fur to denote electric shock. It speaks in a lively voice that sounds like Nana Mizuki, likewise she voices it in the anime. In a scene where Natsuru was asked to turn on the TV in the hotel, it stated a preference for watching Hanshin Tigers baseball games.

Messenger for Mikoto in the appearance of a strangled dog with a noose tied around its neck. It speaks with a soft, subdued voice typical of many characters voiced by Mamiko Noto, who in turn voices it in the anime. In a scene where Natsuru was asked to turn on the TV in the hotel, it stated a preference for watching rare commercials that are only broadcast in certain regions.

The oldest Messenger in the form of a black scorched lion. Its existence said to pre-date the Zōmotsu Animal toyline. The novel version of it does not have its guts hanging out of its body like the Entrails Animals after it, but the anime version does. It has the same shape as a character which Kaede imagined before, with a voice similar to that of a voice actor who performs voice-overs for foreign movie stars. Kaede got it by mere chance though it is very rare. In episode 11 of the anime, it reveals the reason behind the Kämpfer battles.

A tsundere messenger that in the form of a penguin that has a suspended fish jumping out of its gaping mouth and its innards are pulled out from both the front and back. It is a parody to its seiyu's vocal specialty.

Supporting characters

A first-year member of the school's Newspaper Club, she is always after the latest scoop and has a habit of exaggerating her findings. She has long straight purple hair. She and Akane are childhood friends.

The leader of the trio of girls in Female Nasturu's class who exploits the latter's popularity for fun and profit. She has short brown hair and glasses.

One of the trio of girls in Female Nasturu class who exploits the latter's popularity. Unlike the others, she is attracted to the Female Natsuru and will not hesitate to be close to her when given the chance. She has short blond hair that covers part of her face.

One of the trio of girls in Female Natsuru class who exploits the latter's popularity and who serves as the trio accountant. She tends to sell things to the Female Natsuru. She has short purple hair, and carries a calculator.

He has spiky light brown hair.

White Kämpfers
The White Kämpfers are a group of Kämpfers who follow orders from Kaede, after receiving their messengers during the Miss Seitetsu contest. Their surnames are similar to some voice actresses, who in turn voiced them in the anime.

Schwert user armed with a kusarigama. She is a middle school student, and she is the only character who wears a different school uniform.

Schwert user armed with a sabre. She is incompetent and indecisive, and also acts like a tsundere.

Gewehr user armed with an MAC-10 submachine gun. She seems to be afraid of everything, especially the Blue and Red Kampfer.

Zauber user. She attacks by launching energy bolts against her enemies. She is a self-proclaimed tomboy, and she is noticeably tall and athletic in comparison to the other white Kampfer.

Media

Light novels
The light novel series written by Toshihiko Tsukiji, with illustrations by Senmu, were released under Media Factory's MF Bunko J imprint, with 15 volumes released between November 24, 2006 and March 25, 2010. The main series covers 12 volumes, while the remaining three are short story collections.

Manga
A manga adaptation, written by Tsukiji and illustrated by Yu Tachibana, began serialization in the April 2008 issue of Monthly Comic Alive. The first tankōbon volume was released on October 23, 2008; ten volumes have been released and has been concluded as of September 26, 2018.

Anime

A 12-episode anime series adaptation produced by Nomad, directed by Yasuhiro Kuroda, and written by Kazuyuki Fudeyasu aired in Japan on TBS between October 2 and December 17, 2009. The anime has been licensed in North America by Sentai Filmworks. Distributor Section23 Films, through its Sentai Filmworks division, released the series in a complete collection on January 18, 2011. An additional two episodes, titled , were screened at an event held at Odaiba Cinema Mediage theater in Tokyo on March 6, 2011, with only one of the episodes aired on TBS on April 8, 2011. Sentai Filmworks re-released the series on Blu-ray with an English dub on May 28, 2019.

Reception
Theron Martin of Anime News Network called the series a "spiritual descendant" of Maze: The Mega-Burst Space and Ranma ½ which feature characters who regularly switch genders, but is a "harem comedy." However, Martin argues that the action-oriented and harem-oriented elements are not balanced in the series, with the harem comedy stronger, and said that the "perverse and sometimes twisted sense of humor" of the show works best, and even says that while there is fan service, it is "fairly tame by recent standards." He also said that the music score has "fun little themes" and said the plot "is a mess."

References

External links
 Kämpfer anime at TBS 
 Kämpfer anime at StarChild 
 

2006 Japanese novels
2008 manga
2009 anime television series debuts
2011 anime television series debuts
Anime and manga based on light novels
Action anime and manga
Harem anime and manga
Light novels
Media Factory manga
Kadokawa Dwango franchises
MF Bunko J
Nomad (company)
School life in anime and manga
Seinen manga
Sentai Filmworks
TBS Television (Japan) original programming
Japanese LGBT-related animated television series
Transgender in anime and manga